Marco Schank (born 10 October 1954 in Ettelbruck) is a Luxembourgian politician for the Christian Social People's Party (CSV) and author.  He is a member of the national legislature, the Chamber of Deputies, representing the Nord constituency since 2 February 1999.

He has been the mayor of Heiderscheid since 1 January 1994.  Prior to that, he was a councillor in Heinerscheid (1982–1993).

Schank is the President of the Upper Sûre Natural Park, and has been President of the National Tourism Office since 13 March 2000 to 2009.  He has been the Secretary-General of the CSV since 2006, having first joined the party in 1994.

Footnotes

External links
  Chamber of Deputies official biography

1954 births
Living people
People from Ettelbruck
Christian Social People's Party politicians
Luxembourgian writers
Mayors of places in Luxembourg
Members of the Chamber of Deputies (Luxembourg)
Members of the Chamber of Deputies (Luxembourg) from Nord
Councillors in Luxembourg